
Gmina Bobrowniki is a rural gmina (administrative district) in Będzin County, Silesian Voivodeship, in southern Poland.

Villages
Gmina Bobrowniki contains the villages and settlements of Bobrowniki, Dobieszowice, Myszkowice, Rogoźnik, Siemonia and Twardowice.

Neighbouring gminas
Gmina Bobrowniki is bordered by the towns of Będzin, Piekary Śląskie, Tarnowskie Góry and Wojkowice, and by the gminas of Mierzęcice, Psary and Świerklaniec.

References

Bobrowniki
Gmina Bobrowniki